Norway competed at the 1998 Winter Olympics in Nagano, Japan.

Medalists

Alpine skiing

Men

Men's combined

Women

Women's combined

Biathlon

Men

Men's 4 × 7.5 km relay

Women

Women's 4 × 7.5 km relay

 1 A penalty loop of 150 metres had to be skied per missed target.
 2 One minute added per missed target.

Bobsleigh

Cross-country skiing

Men

 1 Starting delay based on 10 km results. 
 C = Classical style, F = Freestyle

Men's 4 × 10 km relay

Women

 2 Starting delay based on 5 km results. 
 C = Classical style, F = Freestyle

Women's 4 × 5 km relay

Curling

Men's tournament

Group stage
Top four teams advanced to semi-finals.

|}

Medal round
Semi-final

Bronze medal game

Women's tournament

Group stage
Top four teams advanced to semi-finals.

|}

Contestants

Freestyle skiing

Women

Nordic combined 

Men's individual

Events:
 normal hill ski jumping
 15 km cross-country skiing 

Men's Team

Four participants per team.

Events:
 normal hill ski jumping
 5 km cross-country skiing

Ski jumping 

Men's team large hill

 1 Four teams members performed two jumps each.

Snowboarding

Men's halfpipe

Women's halfpipe

Speed skating

Men

Women

References
 Official Olympic Reports
 International Olympic Committee results database
 Olympic Winter Games 1998, full results by sports-reference.com

Nations at the 1998 Winter Olympics
1998
1998 in Norwegian sport